Sebastien E. Boucher (born October 19, 1981) is a Canadian former professional baseball outfielder.

Career
Boucher played college baseball for the Bethune–Cookman Wildcats. In 2004, he was named the Mid-Eastern Athletic Conference Player of the Year. In 2021, on the occasion of the conference's fiftieth anniversary, he was named to the MEAC All-Time Baseball Team.

Boucher was originally drafted by the Seattle Mariners in the 7th round (213th overall) in the 2004 Major League Baseball draft from Bethune–Cookman.

On August 9, 2007, Boucher was traded to the Baltimore Orioles for LHP John Parrish.

He moved on to independent baseball, playing with the Quebec Capitales in the Can-Am League where he won the batting title in 2014.

International career
Boucher also played for the Canadian national team at the 2006 World Baseball Classic.

References

External links

1981 births
Living people
Águilas Cibaeñas players
Canadian expatriate baseball players in the Dominican Republic
Baseball outfielders
Baseball people from Quebec
Bowie Baysox players
Canadian baseball coaches
Canadian expatriate baseball players in the United States
Inland Empire 66ers of San Bernardino players
Norfolk Tides players
Ottawa Champions players
Québec Capitales players
San Antonio Missions players
Sportspeople from Gatineau
Tacoma Rainiers players
Waikiki Beach Boys players
West Tennessee Diamond Jaxx players
Wisconsin Timber Rattlers players
World Baseball Classic players of Canada
2006 World Baseball Classic players
Bethune–Cookman Wildcats baseball players